Edwyn Burnaby (29 September 1798 – 18 July 1867) of Baggrave Hall, Leicestershire, was an English landowner, courtier, a Justice of the Peace, Deputy Lieutenant, and High Sheriff of Leicestershire in 1864. He succeeded his father in the Court post of Gentleman of the Privy chamber. He was a maternal great-grandfather of Queen Elizabeth The Queen Mother and therefore a direct ancestor of Queen Elizabeth II and King Charles III. 

Edwyn was the eldest son of Edwyn Andrew Burnaby, (died 1 October 1825), and his wife Mary, daughter and heiress of the Reverend William Browne and his wife Mary Adcock. His grandfather was Andrew Burnaby. He was baptised on 30 September 1798 at Rotherby, Leicestershire, and was probably born the day before as various editions of Burke's Landed Gentry and other published sources give his date of birth as 29 September 1799. His age is given as 19 on matriculation at Worcester College, Oxford on 20 October 1817. He was educated at Christ Church, Oxford, and served as a captain in the Prince of Wales's Dragoon Guards.

On 29 August 1829, he married Anne Caroline Salisbury, daughter of Thomas Salisbury (solicitor), by Frances, daughter of Francis Webb.

They had several children, including:
Edwyn Sherard Burnaby (1830–1883), major-general and Member of Parliament
Caroline Louisa Burnaby (1832–1918)
Cecilia Florence Burnaby (d. 1869), married George Onslow Newton.
Gertrude Laura Burnaby (d. 1865), married Ernest Vaughan, 5th Earl of Lisburne (1836–1888)
Ida Charlotte Burnaby (1839–1886) m. John Augustus Conolly (1829–1888)

References

1798 births
1867 deaths
Alumni of Christ Church, Oxford
Alumni of Worcester College, Oxford
3rd Dragoon Guards officers
Deputy Lieutenants of Leicestershire
High Sheriffs of Leicestershire
Gentlemen of the Privy Chamber
English landowners
People from Harborough District
19th-century British businesspeople